Jiang Yingrong (born 1 February 1988), also known as Vivi Jiang, is a Chinese singer. She studied at Beijing Contemporary Music Academy (北京现代音乐学院) and majored in pop music. She attended many competitions and got many awards, such as the top 4 and the most potential singer in Yili College Students Music Festival (伊利全国大学生音乐节). She became famous for she got the first place in Super Girl (超级女声) in 2009. According to sina.com.cn, she has "millions of fans".

Biography
Jiang was born in Chengdu, Sichuan. Her father used to be an army officer. He started to do business soon after. Her parents divorced when she was 12 years old, and she has been living together with her mother since then. She dropped out of high school when she was 15 years and began to learn music in Sichuan Art School (四川音乐学校). She sang in a famous pub named Music House and was taught by Chen Di (陈迪). Jiang entered Beijing Contemporary Music Academy (北京现代音乐学院) in 2006.

Jiang started her competition in 2007. She first joined in College Students Music Festival and was outstanding in that competition. She was the first contestant in Top 20 and got the fourth place. She sang the theme song July (七月) for the famous movie Transfer of Love ( 《爱情呼叫转移》 ). The competition Super Girl (TV series) made her become very popular in China. She was the No.1 in Chengdu division. Jiang had been the weekly winner three times, and it was no surprise that she got the first place in the competition.

She attended several concerts in Changchun, Shanghai, Wenzhou, Beijing, Nanjing and Guangzhou.

Personal interest
Jiang is inspired by Lady Gaga, Beyoncé, Pink, Michael Jackson, and Jay-Z.

Awards

Discography
 Bad Angel 坏天使 (Album) (2010)
 Charming Woman 女人帮 (EP) (2011)
 Fashion Show 發生秀 (EP) (2013)
 EGO 我，不是我 (EP) (2015)
 WHY NOT? (EP) (2017)
 Instinct 10 (EP) (2019)
 Princess Charming 大码公主 (EP) (2021)

References

External links
Jiang's blog
Jiang on Weibo
ViviFans.com, a fan club for Jiang

Super Girl contestants
Living people
Singers from Chengdu
1988 births